"I'm Crying" is a song originally performed by the English rock/R&B band The Animals. Written by the group's lead vocalist Eric Burdon and organist Alan Price, it was their first original composition released as a single. The song was released in September 1964 and became their second transatlantic hit after "The House of the Rising Sun", which was released earlier in the year (see 1964 in music). The single became a Top 20 hit in Canada, the United Kingdom, and the United States.

Reception and charts 
Cash Box described it as "a pulsating lament that the crew pounds out in electrifying fashion" and "a powerful r&b-styled instrumental showcase."

Even when the single became a hit, it was nowhere near the hit that "The House of the Rising Sun" was, so songs written by members of the band were kept as b-sides until the band changed record producers from Mickie Most to Tom Wilson in 1966.

Personnel 

 Eric Burdon – lead and backing vocals
 Chas Chandler – bass guitar, backing vocals
 Hilton Valentine – guitar, backing vocals
 Alan Price – keyboards
 John Steel – drums

Cover versions 
There are many covers of it, including:
Eric Burdon
Iggy Pop
Mondo Topless
Paul Revere & the Raiders
The Pretty Things
The Secret Service
Bobby Sherman
SRC
Tom Petty and the Heartbreakers
The Doughboys (2007)
Dead Brothers (de), as Crying

References 

1964 singles
The Animals songs
Iggy Pop songs
Songs written by Eric Burdon
Song recordings produced by Mickie Most
Columbia Records singles
1964 songs